Béatrix Midant-Reynes is a French Egyptologist who was director of the Institut français d'archéologie orientale from 2010 to 2015. In 2004, Midant-Reynes won the Diane Potier-Boès Award for her work on the origins of Egypt. Midant-Reynes currently co-directs archaeological work at Wadi Sannur. She previously also was director of archaeological work at Tell el-Iswid from 2006 to 2016, Kom el-Khilgan from 2002 to 2005, co-director at Adaïma from 1989 to 2005, co-director at Maghar-Dendera in 1987.  She was also responsible for the publication of the lithic material at the Ain Asil site, Dakhla Oasis.

Publications
 Felsbilder Nubiens : Verhältnis zu den prädynastischen Kulturen Ägyptens, 1974
 Les gestes de l'artisan égyptien, 1981
 Le nain de Pount, 1990
 Préhistoire de l'Egypte : des premiers hommes aux premiers pharaons, 1992
 Ouserrê, prince du Nil, 1992
 La gestion de l'eau dans l'Égypte ancienne, 1994
 Léau et le pouvoir, 1995
 Sources et acquisition des matières premières, 1997
 Le silex de Àyn-Aṣ-il : oasis de Dakhla-Balat, 1998
 Les questions de chronologie, 1999
 The prehistory of Egypt : from the first Egyptians to the first pharaohs, 2000
 Le sacrifice humain en contexte funéraire, 2000
 L'invention de l'écriture, 2001
 Adaïma, 2002
 Economie et habitat, 2002
 Aux origines de l'Égypte : du Néolithique à la naissance de l'État, 2003
 L'Égypte et ses voisins aux 5e et 4e millénaire, 2004
 L'Egypte des premiers pharaons : dossier, 2004
 L'Egypte prédynastique, 2005
 Les civilisations préhistoriques du Soudan ancien. Hommage à Francis Geus, 2006
 Portraits : les pionniers de la préhistoire en Égypte, 2007
 La naissance de l'architecture funéraire'', 2008

References

French archaeologists
French women archaeologists
French Egyptologists
Living people
Year of birth missing (living people)
French women historians
Members of the Institut Français d'Archéologie Orientale